HBC Celles-sur-Belle is a women's handball team based in Celles-sur-Belle, France that plays in the LFH Féminine Division.

Team

Current squad
Squad for the season 2022-23 - Professional players

Goalkeepers
 1  Laura Portes
 12  Jessica Sogoyou
 16  Justine Hicquebrant (c)
Wingers
LW
 13  Hawa Kanté
 96  Lisa Calvet
RW
 6  Charline Aube-Bubl
 7  Lesly Briémant
Line players
 9  Laura Dorp
 10  Goundouba Guirassy
 21  Mirja Lyngsø Jensen

Back players
LB
 5  Marjorie Demunck
 11  Carolina Loureiro
 22  Hanna Åhlén
 42  Perrine Petiot
CB
 55  Julie Pontoppidan
 78  Fanta Diagouraga
RB
 8  Dijana Števin
 19  Paola Ebanga Baboga

Transfers
Transfers for the 2023–24 season

 Joining

 Leaving

Technical staff
Staff for the 2022-23 season.
 Head coach: Thierry Vincent
 Assistant coach: Maxime Martin
 Physical coach: Fabian Renouf

References

External links
    

 
Handball clubs established in 1976 
French handball clubs
1976 establishments in France
Sport in Deux-Sèvres